Joseph Porter may refer to:

Music
Joe Porter (producer), record producer and songwriter
Joseph Porter, founder of British rock group Blyth Power
Joe Porter, former drummer of the band Jars of Clay

Sportsmen
Joey Porter (born 1977), American football player
Joe Porter (cricketer) (born 1980), English cricketer
Joe Porter (American football) (born 1985), American football player

Fictional characters
 Sir Joseph Porter, fictional Lord of the Admiralty in H.M.S. Pinafore
 Joseph Porter, a fictional character in Hollywood Pinafore
 Mrs Joseph Porter, one of the Sketches by Boz, short stories by Charles Dickens

Others
 Joseph C. Porter (1819–1863), Confederate officer in the American Civil War
 The Dr. Joseph Y. Porter House, a historic home in Key West, Florida
Joe A. Porter, American landscape architect